The National University of La Pampa (UNLPAM) is an Argentine national university, situated in the city of Santa Rosa, capital of La Pampa Province.

See also
Science and Education in Argentina
Argentine Higher Education Official Site 
 Argentine Universities

 
1973 establishments in Argentina
Educational institutions established in 1973